Radišići is a village in Bosnia and Herzegovina, in Ljubuški municipality of West Herzegovina Canton. According to 2013 census, it has 2,363 inhabitants, predominantly Croats (99,45%).

The first mention of the toponym Radišići dates back to 1585.

Radišići is among the biggest villages in Western Herzegowina, located between Ljubuški and Proboj, as a part of Zabiokovlje. Village belongs to Trebižat drainage basin.

Demographics 
According to the 2013 census, its population was 2,363.

Literature
 Šarac, Petar, Šarac, Stanko: , Zagreb, 2011, .

References

Populated places in Ljubuški